Panther Creek is a west-draining left-bank tributary of the Little Schuylkill River's drainage basin and rises in the vicinity of the east side of Lansford in the plateau-like nearly flat terrain of the complex three-way saddle between Mount Pisgah to its east, Nesquehoning Ridge to the north and Pisgah Ridge to the south, both ridgelines flanking its entire course as it makes its way ENE-to-WSW.

The creek's valley is historically and industrially important having been mostly owned by the historically significant Lehigh Coal & Navigation Company which eventually built the Panther Creek Railroad from Lansford to Tamaqua and the Hauto Tunnel to haul coal from the copious anthracite deposits, collieries, and coal breakers along an easier route than up and over the mountains to Mauch Chunk and the Lehigh Canal via Summit Hill, PA and the Mauch Chunk & Summit Hill Railway, North America's second oldest operational railroad and both its first Gravity & Switchback railroads. The coal seams of the valley were the first deposits discovered and exploited by any company beginning with surface deposits along the south ridge leading to the founding of Summit Hill, then Lansford in western Carbon County, then the downstream towns of Coaldale and Tamaqua in eastern Schuylkill County.

Today the so called 'New Company', a leaned-down and reorganized Lehigh Coal and Navigation Company (note the slight title change) still mines the coal deposits in the valley and owns all of its mineral rights. As they mine above Panther Creek the creek has been heavily polluted over the years. How a company can take a natural resource that should belong to everyone and destroy it without retrobution is something that cannot continue to happen. In recent years creeks and rivers have been being rehabilitated and this wonderful little creek should be brought back to life.

See also
List of rivers of Pennsylvania

References

External links
Little Beaver Creek Land Foundation

Rivers of Pennsylvania
Rivers of Carbon County, Pennsylvania
Rivers of Schuylkill County, Pennsylvania
Tributaries of the Schuylkill River